Bolitoglossa mulleri is a species of salamander in the family Plethodontidae.
It is found in Guatemala and Mexico.
Its natural habitats are subtropical or tropical moist lowland forests, subtropical or tropical moist montane forests, plantations, and rural gardens.
It is threatened by habitat loss.

References

Sources

Bolitoglossa
Taxonomy articles created by Polbot
Amphibians described in 1883